Felix Pedro Alvarado Sanchez (born 15 February 1989) is a Nicaraguan professional boxer who held the IBF light flyweight title from 2018 to 2022. He previously challenged for the IBF flyweight title in 2022, the WBA (Regular) light flyweight title in 2013, and the WBA (Regular) flyweight title in 2014. As of January 2022, Alvarado is ranked as the world's best active light flyweight by The Ring, second best by BoxRec and third best by the Transnational Boxing Rankings Board. His twin brother, René Alvarado, is also a professional boxer.

Professional career

IBF light flyweight champion

Alvarado vs. Petalcorin
His victory against Teeraphong Utaida earned Alvarado the #1 rank in the IBF light flyweight rankings, which made him the mandatory title challenger to the reigning champion Hekkie Budler. Accordingly, IBF ordered Budler to defend against Alvarado. On July 25, 2018, Budler vacated the title, unsatisfied with the purse bid. Sampson Boxing won the bid with a $25 000 offer, with 75% going to Budler and 25% to Alvarado. On July 26, 2018, IBF ordered its two highest ranking light flyweight contenders Randy Petalcorin and Felix Alvarado to fight for the vacant IBF title. The fight was scheduled for October 29, 2018, at the Midas Hotel and Casino in Pasay, Philippines.

Alvarado won the fight by a seventh-round technical knockout, dropping his opponent three times in just over two minutes. The first knockdown came early on in the round, via body shot. Alvarado increased his already high pace, knocking Pentalcorin twice more, until he elected to stay down for the ten-count.

Alvarado vs. Konishi
Alvarado was scheduled to make his first title defense against the one-time WBA World Light Fly Title challenger Reiya Konishi on May 19, 2019 at the Portopia Hotel in Kobe, Japan. Alvarado won the fight by unanimous decision, with scores of 118-110, 116-112 and 117-111. Konishi gave Alvarado a competitive fight until the seventh round, after which Alvarado took over the fight. All three judges awarded Alvarado rounds eight through eleven.

Alvarado vs. Kriel
Alvarado was scheduled to fight the reigning WBC light flyweight champion Kenshiro Teraji in a title unification bout on December 23, 2019. The fight was scheduled for the undercard of the Ryota Murata and Steven Butler WBA World Middleweight title bout. On November 19, 2019, Alvarado withdrew from the bout, as he was unable to train due to a bronchial problem.

Alvarado was next scheduled to make his second title defense against the 2019 IBF mini flyweight titlist Deejay Kriel. The fight was booked for January 2, 2021 at the American Airlines Center in Dallas, Texas, United States. Alvarado scored knockdowns in rounds two and four, before finishing his opponent by technical knockout in the tenth round.

Alvarado vs. Vasquez
Alvarado was expected to defend his IBF junior flyweight title against Erik Lopez on August 14, 2021, at the Ford Center at The Star in Frisco, Texas, United States. Lopez was later forced to withdraw from the bout, as he was unable to acquire a visa. Alvarado was rescheduled to face Israel Vasquez on the same date and venue in a non-title bout. Alvarado won the fight by a first-round knockout. He needed a little over two minutes to knock Lopez out with a right hook.

Alvardo vacated the IBF light flyweight title on March 22, 2022, in order to move up to flyweight.

Move to flyweight
Alvarado was booked to face Luis Cerrito Hernandez (10–5–1) in Managua, Nicaragua on May 21, 2022, in his first fight at flyweight. He won the fight by a fourth-round knockout, after knocking Hernandez down in both the second and fourth rounds.

On September 8, 2022, the reigning IBF flyweight champion Sunny Edwards was ordered to enter into negotiations with Alvarado for a mandatory title defense. The championship bout took place on November 11, in London, England. Alvarado lost the fight by unanimous decision, with scores of 115–113, 115–113 and 116–112.

On January 12, 2023, the IBF ordered Alvarado to face the sanctioning body's third ranked flyweight contender Cristofer Rosales in a flyweight title eliminator.

Professional boxing record

See also
List of world light-flyweight boxing champions

References

External links

Felix Alvarado - Profile, News Archive & Current Rankings at Box.Live

|-

1989 births
Living people
Sportspeople from Managua
Nicaraguan male boxers
Light-flyweight boxers
Flyweight boxers
World light-flyweight boxing champions
International Boxing Federation champions
Nicaraguan twins